Is This Real? is the debut album by British band lisahall. It was released by Reprise on 15 September 1998.

Critical reception
The Santa Fe Reporter praised the album, calling its music "a dark, hook-laden brand of pop-rock, dipped in menace and swirled through a somnambulist, druggy sensibility." AllMusic wrote that when the band "hook onto a killer groove, like they do on the sweetly biting 'Comatose,' their pop aptitude overrides their electronic one with a shimmering enthusiasm that's positively catching." Entertainment Weekly wrote that a couple of songs "merge trip-hop dance grooves and loopy shape-shifting to Hall’s girlishly appealing voice for warm, emotive pop-tronica."

Track listing

References

1998 debut albums
Lisahall albums